Suzanne Bertish (born 7 August 1951, Hammersmith, London) is an English actress.

Educated at Woldingham School, Bertish joined the Royal Shakespeare Company and appeared in many of its productions, including its marathon eight-and-a-half-hour version of Charles Dickens's The Life and Adventures of Nicholas Nickleby, in which she played three roles. She repeated these three roles in the 1982 television version of the complete play. She was later seen in the BBC Television Shakespeare production of Shakespeare's The Comedy of Errors (1983) as Adriana.

She has also played small roles in several films, including the Harrison Ford vehicle Hanover Street, and the vampire film The Hunger. She had a recurring role as Eleni in the cable television series Rome (2005–2007). In 2009 she had a role in a production of Breakfast at Tiffany's at the Theatre Royal Haymarket.

She also appeared as a female Arnold Rimmer (Arlene Rimmer), in an episode of Red Dwarf, "Parallel Universe" (1988).

Actress

 1978: Armchair Thriller    .... Clare Omney (3 episodes, 1978)
 1979: ITV Playhouse   .... Lena (1 episode, 1979)
 1979: Hanover Street    .... The French Girl
 1979: BBC Play of the Month    .... Kate Croy (1 episode, 1979)
 1981: The Three Sisters    (TV) .... Masha
 1981: Maybury   .... Julia Charlton (1 episode, 1981)
 1982: The Life and Adventures of Nicholas Nickleby   .... Fanny Squeers / ... (2 episodes, 1982)
 1982: Shakespeare Lives!    TV series
 1983: The Comedy of Errors    (TV) .... Adriana
 1983: The Hunger   .... Phyllis
 1983: To the Lighthouse   (TV) .... Lily Briscoe
 1984: Shine on Harvey Moon    .... Frieda Gottlieb (17 episodes, 1984–1985)
 1984: Freud   TV mini-series .... Minna Bernays
 1984: Play for Today   .... Alice Durkow (1 episode, 1984)
 1986: Girls on Top   .... RSC Actress 1 (1 episode, 1986)
 1986: Ladies in Charge   .... Clara Cane (1 episode, 1986)
 1986: Lenny Henry Tonite   (1 episode, 1986)
 1987: Hearts of Fire   .... Anne Ashton
 1988: Red Dwarf   .... Arlene Rimmer (1 episode, 1988)
 1988: Inspector Morse   .... Cheryl Baines (1 episode, 1988)
 1988: The Modern World: Ten Great Writers   .... Rebekka West (1 episode, 1988)
 1989: The Bill   .... Dr. Reece (1 episode, 1989)
 1989: A Day in Summer    (TV) .... Georgina
 1990: Casualty   .... Caroline Collier (1 episode, 1990)
 1990: The Monk   .... Sister Mariana
 1992: Shakespeare: The Animated Tales   .... Titania (1 episode, 1992)
 1992: Venice/Venice   .... Carlotta
 1993: Screen One   .... Rosa Klein (1 episode, 1993)
 1993: 15: The Life and Death of Philip Knight    (TV) .... Margaret Harris
 1993: Lifestories: Families in Crisis   .... Dean Stellar (1 episode, 1993)
 1994: Mr. Bean    .... Art Teacher (1 episode, 1994)
 1994: Love Hurts   .... Mirav Levison (4 episodes, 1994)
 1995: Absolutely Fabulous   .... Gina (1 episode, 1995)
 1995: Thin Ice    .... Lotte
 1995: Space Precinct    .... Regina Baylek (1 episode, 1995)
 1996: Crimetime    .... Lady Macbeth
 1997: Bent   .... Half-woman, half-man
 1997: Peak Practice   .... Dr. Brodie (1 episode, 1997)
 1998: Coronation Street   .... Viv Fay (1 episode, 1998)
 1999: The Scarlet Pimpernel   .... La Touraine (1 episode, 1999)
 1999: The 13th Warrior    .... Hulda
 2000: Silent Witness    .... Eva Horowitz (1 episode, 2000)
 2003: The Roman Spring of Mrs. Stone    (TV) .... Julia
 2003: The Commander    (TV) .... Vivian Newburgh
 2004: Rosemary & Thyme    .... Emma Standish (1 episode, 2004)
 2004: The Grid   TV mini-series .... Sarah Camfield (unknown episodes)
 2004: Judas    (TV) .... Rohab
 2005: Love Soup   .... Sally (1 episode, 2005)
 2005: The Toybox   .... Madeline Usher
 2005: The Upside of Anger    .... Gina
 2007: Rome   .... Eleni (14 episodes, 2005–2007)
 2007: Trial & Retribution   .... Ms Newburgh (1 episode, 2007)
 2009: Die Päpstin    .... Bishop Arnaldo
 2009: Holy Money   .... Charlotte
 2010: Agatha Christie's Poirot   .... Miss Milray (1 episode, 2010)
 2011: W.E. .... Lady Cunard 
 2016: Mercy Street  .... Matron Brannan
 2017: The Wife .... Dusty Berkowitz
 2017: Film Stars Don't Die in Liverpool .... Fifi Oscard
 2021: Sex Education .... Relationship Counselor/Therapist
 2021: Benediction

References

External links
 

1951 births
English film actresses
English stage actresses
English television actresses
Living people
Actresses from London
People educated at Woldingham School
People from Hammersmith